Harbin-Bei'an  railway, named the Binbei Railway, is a  double-tracked arterial railroad in Northeast China between Harbin and Bei'an. At Harbin the line connects to the Jingha Railway, the Binzhou Railway, and the Binsui Railway, whilst at Suihua it connects to the Suijia Railway and at Bei'an it connects to the Qibei Railway and the Beihei Railway.

History
The Harbin–Bei'an railway started out as two separate railway lines built by two privately owned railway companies, the Huhai Railway and the Haike Railway.

The Huhai Railway was the first self-funded privately owned railway company in Heilongjiang. It began surveying a line from Songpu to Hailun in September 1925, opening the  line on 15 December 1928. In 1929, the railway's wooden bridge was replaced with a permanent iron bridge. Work on the Haike Railway's line from Hailun to Bei'an began in June 1932, and was opened to traffic on a temporary basis in 1 December of the same year.

In 1933, after the creation of the Japanese puppet state of Manchukuo, both companies were nationalised by the Manchukuo National Railway, and the two companies' lines were merged to create a single line, called the Binbei Line (Hinboku Line in Japanese). The Manchukuo National continued construction of the Hailun–Bei'an section, replacing the temporary bridges with permanent ones. The line was finally completed in 1935.

In August 1945, the Soviet Army invaded Manchukuo, taking over management of all railways in the former Manchukuo, creating the China Changchun Railway; the Binbei Line was put under the jurisdiction of the Qiqihar Railway Bureau. The Soviets transferred control of the China Changchun Railway to China in 1955, at which time this line became part of the China Railway system. In 1957, the line was transferred to the jurisdiction of the Harbin Railway Bureau, and double-tracking of the  Sankeshu–Suihua section of the line was completed. Double-tracking of the rest of the line was completed in 1962.

Route

References

Railway lines in China
Rail transport in Heilongjiang
Standard gauge railways in China
Railway lines in Manchukuo
Railway lines opened in 1928
Railway lines opened in 1932